Assassin's Creed III: The Tyranny of King Washington is a downloadable content (DLC) expansion pack developed and published by Ubisoft for the 2012 action-adventure video game Assassin's Creed III. Set in 1783, it follows the main playable character of Assassin's Creed III, Ratonhnaké:ton / Connor, as he awakens in what appears to be an alternate reality where the events of the main game involving him have never happened. He is tasked to find and defeat a fictionalized version of George Washington, who is empowered but mentally corrupted by an otherworldly artifact. After crowning himself King of the newly-founded United States of America, Washington began to enslave the population of the American frontier and massacre those who resist his tyranny. Connor gains new mystical abilities over the course of the pack's narrative as he attempts to stop Washington and return to his original timeline. 

The Tyranny of King Washington is the first major post-launch DLC pack for Assassin's Creed III. It consists of three episodes: The Infamy, The Betrayal and The Redemption, which were released periodically from February to April 2013 on various platforms. All three episodes are included as part of a 2019 compilation titled Assassin's Creed III Remastered, which collects remastered versions of Assassin's Creed III and all related content. Each of the DLC episodes were met with mixed reviews from video game publications.

Gameplay
 
The Tyranny of King Washington is a downloadable content (DLC) pack for the 2012 video game Assassin's Creed III.  It consists of a single-player narrative campaign which is separated into three episodic installments. Players assume the role of Ratonhnaké:ton (also known by his adopted English name, Connor), a half-British, half-Mohawk member of the Brotherhood of Assassins. While The Tyranny of King Washington features a continuation of the gameplay elements from the base game, Connor never had the opportunity to become an Assassin in this continuity. Instead, he gains new mystical powers in each episodic instalment which are themed after his Mohawk cultural heritage: the "Power of the Bear" for strength, the "Power of the Eagle" for speed, the "Power of the Wolf" for stealth. Other abilities include "Warpaint" which enhance the aforementioned abilities, and "Alpha of the Pack" which summons astral wolves to assist in battle.

Plot
Some time after the events of Assassin's Creed III and the end of the Revolutionary War, George Washington secretly meets with Connor, telling him of dreams he has received from an Apple of Eden he had seized. Concerned, Connor attempts to take the Apple from Washington, but is transported into an alternate timeline, created by Washington's nightmares. In this reality, Connor never became an Assassin, his mother Kaniehti:io is still alive, his father Haytham Kenway died years ago, and Washington, mad with power, has crowned himself the "Mad King" of the United States. After Kaniehti:io tries and fails to steal Washington's source of power, a Scepter with the Apple at the top, a furious Washington mobilizes his army to eliminate her and Connor's tribe. In desperation, the tribe's Clan Mother brews the Tea of the Great Willow, which can grant great physical abilities with crippling side effects. However, Kaniehti:io forbids Connor from drinking the tea and gifts him Haytham's old Hidden Blades. Washington's forces attack, slaughtering the tribe and killing Kaniehti:io. Connor attempts to fight back, but is overpowered by Washington's Scepter and gunned down.

Five months later, after Connor has recovered, the Clan Mother insists that only the Tea can stop Washington. Connor brews and drinks it, gaining the power to turn invisible and summon spectral wolves. The Clan Mother is later killed in a raid led by General Benedict Arnold, leading Connor to kill him. With his dying breath, Arnold reveals that he had been mind controlled by Washington, and directs Connor to seek Benjamin Franklin. Connor is captured by General Israel Putnam and taken to Boston to be executed, but manages to escape. In the process, he reunites with his childhood friend Kanen'tó:kon, who is part of a resistance group led by Samuel Adams. After Kanen'tó:kon reveals that drinking more of the Tea can grant additional powers, Connor does so, gaining the ability to transform into an eagle. Connor then tracks down Franklin and frees him from Washington's control. Franklin agrees to help Connor eliminate Washington. However, Putnam ambushes and kills Adams and his rebels. With no other choice, Connor and Franklin seize a ship to escape Boston. Putnam attempts to stop them but is killed by Connor. Connor, Franklin, and Kanen'tó:kon set sail to New York, where Washington is building a pyramid.

Upon arriving, their ship is attacked by Washington's navy, scattering the crew. Kanen'tó:kon sacrifices himself to protect Franklin, and Connor drinks the Tea again, granting him the strength of a bear. They encounter another resistance group led by Thomas Jefferson attempting to attack Washington's pyramid. Connor helps Jefferson's rebels withdraw, and works to gain additional support. Washington addresses the people with a speech, boasting about his plans to invade England and enslave its people. Eventually, Connor sows enough chaos and support that the entire city rises up against Washington. Using a special key provided by Franklin, Connor infiltrates the pyramid, where he battles and defeats Washington. As Connor reaches for the Scepter, he is returned to his own timeline.

Terrified by the Apple's power, Washington orders Connor to dispose of it. In his office, Washington is met by an unknown man who suggests he should become the king of the United States. Washington flatly refuses, and the man disappears when Connor tosses the Apple into the sea.

Development and release
On October 3, 2012, Ubisoft revealed The Tyranny of King Washington as the first major downloadable content pack for Assassin's Creed III, and that it would be released in episodic format. The Tyranny of King Washington was available both as a standalone purchase and as part of the season pass for Assassin's Creed III. Scottish composer Lorne Balfe composed the music for The Tyranny of King Washington, with the soundtrack released via digital distribution on April 23, 2013.

On January 24, 2013, the first episode of the DLC was announced, titled The Infamy. It was released on February 19 for Xbox 360 and PC, February 20 for PlayStation 3, and on February 21 for the Wii U. On February 6, 2013, it was announced that the second episode, titled The Betrayal, would be released on March 19 for Xbox 360, PC and PlayStation 3 and an unknown date for Wii U (available in the eShop as of March 27) and that the third episode, titled The Redemption, would be released on April 23 for Xbox 360, PC and PlayStation 3. Despite being given a release date of May 16 for Wii U, The Redemption has been available in the eShop since April 27.

The Tyranny of King Washington is included with the remastered edition of Assassin's Creed III, along all with all previously-released downloadable content.  Assassin's Creed III Remastered was released on March 29, 2019 for Microsoft Windows, PlayStation 4, and Xbox One, and on May 21, 2019 for the Nintendo Switch.

Reception 

According to review aggregator Metacritic, all three episodes of The Tyranny of King Washington received generally mixed or average reviews on PlayStation 3 and Xbox 360, except for the PS3 version of The Infamy which had an overall favorable reception.

See also
Cultural depictions of George Washington
Native Americans in popular culture

References

Further reading

2013 video games
Action-adventure games
Assassin's Creed downloadable content
Cultural depictions of Benjamin Franklin
Cultural depictions of George Washington
Cultural depictions of Thomas Jefferson
Episodic video games
Naval video games
Nintendo Network games
Nintendo Switch games
PlayStation 3 games
PlayStation 4 games
Single-player video games
Stealth video games
Ubisoft games
Video games based on Native American mythology
Video games developed in Canada
Video games scored by Lorne Balfe
Video game sequels
Video games set in Boston
Video games set in Massachusetts
Video games set in New York (state)
Video games set in New York City
Video games set in the United States
Video games set in the 18th century
Wii U eShop games
Wii U games
Windows games
Xbox 360 games
Xbox One games
Xbox One X enhanced games